State Road 117 (NM 117) is a  state road in north west New Mexico, entirely within Cibola County. The southern terminus is at NM 36 near Quemado, and the northern terminus is at NM 122 and Historic U.S. Route 66 in Grants. NM 117 runs through the El Malpais National Conservation Area.

It is one of the roads on the Trails of the Ancients Byway, one of the designated New Mexico Scenic Byways.

History
The portion of NM 117 from I-40 north to NM 122 became a state highway on a road exchange agreement with Cibola County in October 1988.

Major intersections

See also

References

External links

117
Transportation in Cibola County, New Mexico